The Battle of the Adda River occurred in 490 between the Ostrogothic Forces under Theodoric and the remaining army of the Heruli and Sciri under Flavius Odoacer.

References

Ostrogothic Kingdom
490
5th century in Italy
Theoderic the Great
Adda River
Adda River